Susan Burnstine (born 1966) is an American fine art photographer and journalist, originally from Chicago and now based in Los Angeles. She is best known for haunting, ethereal images that illustrate her dreams. She began making photographs as a way of facing and working through nightmares and night terrors that have haunted her since childhood. She is also known for making her own cameras and lenses, initially from ruins of toy camera bodies, and now 100% homemade with additions from found objects and assorted other materials that best represent her vision of her dreams. Burnstine has written for many notable photography publications, including a monthly column for B&W Magazine UK.

Within Shadows
Burnstine's first book, Within Shadows, is a collection of 45 images from three distinct series,  "On Waking Dreams," "Between" and "Flight." The book, which explores her own intense dreams, won a Gold Medal in the Pro Fine Arts division, and a Bronze Medal overall at the 2011 Prix de la Photographie Paris. Within Shadows was also selected as a Best Book of 2011 by PhotoEye Magazine.

Absence of Being
"Absence of Being", Burnstine's second monograph, began after the death of her father, when her nightmares, which had been the impetus for Within Shadows returned. The work is shot from a higher perspective than her earlier work, reflecting the vision of her father, looking down upon her. This body of work retains her signature dark and dramatic, blurred effects. The entirety of this series can be found in her second monograph, "Absence of Being." (Damiani, 2016)

References

External links 
 Susan Burnstine website
 Madeleine Brand interviews Susan Burnstine on NPR/KCRW PRESS PLAY
 Susan Burnstine Solo Exhibit in San Francisco Reviewed by Jonathan Curiel, 2018
 Susan Burnstine Solo Exhibit in Chicago Reviewed by Elliot Reichert, 2015
 A Photo Editor Interview with Susan Burnstine by Jonathan Blaustein
 Review of Susan Burnstine Solo Exhibit in San Francisco by Jonathan Curiel, 2012
 Susan Burnstine interview on Lenscratch by Aline Smithson

Living people
1966 births
American photojournalists
University of Miami alumni
People from Northbrook, Illinois
American women photographers
American women journalists
Fine art photographers
Glenbrook North High School alumni
University of Miami School of Communication alumni
21st-century American women
Date of birth missing (living people)
Women photojournalists